Associate Professor Asha Bowen is an Australian Paediatric Infectious Diseases clinician-scientist and a leading voice and advocate for children's health and well-being. She is Head of the Department of Infectious Diseases at Perth Children's Hospital, Head of the Healthy Skin and ARF Prevention team and Program Head of the End Rheumatic Heart Disease (END RHD) program at the Telethon Kids Institute. Bowen leads a large body of skin health research in partnership with healthcare workers and community in the Kimberley while expanding her team and work to understand skin health in urban Aboriginal children better. She has been widely acknowledged and awarded for her contributions towards improving the health and well-being of Australian children, and addressing existing health inequities faced by First Nations Australian children and their families. Throughout the COVID-19 pandemic she contributed her knowledge and expertise to clinical research, guideline development and on several national committees. She has published widely in the area of paediatric infectious diseases and is a recognized expert in the field who regularly contributes to popular Australian media sources such as The Conversation.

Education 
After completing her medical studies at the University of Sydney, Bowen was awarded a Fellowship of the Royal Australasian College of Physicians (FRACP) as a paediatric infectious diseases specialist in 2009. She obtained her PhD at the Menzies School of Health Research in Darwin in 2014 for her thesis titled "The skin sore trial: exploring a better treatment option for impetigo in Indigenous children living in remote Australia" under the supervision of Jonathon Carapetis. Her doctoral work involved the development and delivery of the first randomized controlled trial of treatment options for impetigo amongst remote living Indigenous Australian children, and, one of the largest impetigo trials in the world.

Career, research, community engagement and impact 
Bowen is an expert on Streptococcus pyogenes and Staphylococcus aureus infections which, if left untreated, can lead to life-threatening complications including sepsis, glomerulonephritis and rheumatic fever. She is a lead author of the 2018 "National Healthy Skin Guideline: for the Prevention and Public Health Control of Impetigo, Scabies, Crusted Scabies, and Tinea for Indigenous Populations and Communities in Australia - 1st edition". This guideline is designed to support healthcare professionals, including medical, nursing, allied health and Aboriginal healthcare providers, in the diagnosis, treatment and prevention of these infections. It has been endorsed by The Royal Australasian College of Physicians, Public Health Association Australia, Rheumatic Heart Disease Australia, The Lowitja Institute, Murdoch Children's Research Institute and The Peter Doherty Institute for Infection and Immunity. She has been involved in research that examined the utilization of rapid molecular point-of-care tests to detect and treat Strep A pharyngitis (strep throat) in remote settings to prevent sequalae.

Bowen has been vocal about antimicrobial stewardship and antibiotic resistance issues affecting Indigenous communities residing remote Australia. She has also spoken publicly about shortages in the supply of essential antibiotics, specifically oral trimethoprim-sulfamethoxazole syrup formulations, needed to treat school sores in Aboriginal children.

Throughout the COVID-19 pandemic Bowen has been a leading voice on children's health and well-being. She has advocated for keeping schools open and prioritizing vaccination for teachers and school staff alongside other measures of control such as rapid antigen testing protocols. Bowen has contributed to recommendations on the clinical care of children and adolescents with COVID-19 as part of the Australian National COVID-19 Clinical Evidence Taskforce.

Bowen is the lead investigator on the SToP (See Treat and Prevent) skin sores and scabies Trial which aims to strengthen skin health practices in partnership with healthcare workers and community in the Kimberley. Her research seeks to address the gap in infectious skin conditions between Aboriginal children and other Australian children. Bowen says “I would like to see that Aboriginal children in our country are no more likely to have skin infections and the sequelae of those, such as rheumatic fever, rheumatic heart disease or sepsis than any other children. Working in partnership with Aboriginal people and communities to achieve this, and listening for guidance and opportunities to include a strengths based approach is important'.

Bowen is also lead researcher for the "Staph aureus Network Adaptive Platform Paediatrics and Youth" (SNAP-PY) trial which commenced in February 2022 and will involve 7,000 children and adults across more than 100 hospitals in six countries. The trial aims to identify the most effective treatments for Staphylococcus aureus bloodstream infection.

Through her work as a clinician and researcher, Bowen provides supervision and mentoring to RACP Clinical Trainees and higher-degree research students across the University of Western Australia and Notre Dame University.

Awards and honours 

 2018 L'Oreal-UNCESCO For Women in Science Australia and New Zealand Fellowship
 2019 Bayer Australia Medical Research Establishment Fellowship
 2019 Australian Institute of Policy and Science Tall Poppy Award
 2020 Eureka Prize Emerging Leader in Science
 2022 Frank Fenner Award for Advanced Research in Infectious Diseases

National Health and Medical Research Council (NHMRC)
 2010 National Health and Medical Research Council Postgraduate Scholarship
 2015 National Health and Medical Research Council Early Career Fellowship
 2017 National Health and Medical Research Council Project Grant
 2020 National Health and Medical Research Council Investigator Grant
 2021 National Health and Medical Research Council Synergy Grant (CIB)
 2021 National Health and Medical Research Council Clinical Trials and Cohort Studies grant (CIA)

References 

Year of birth missing (living people)
Living people
Australian women scientists
Australian paediatricians
Women pediatricians
Fellows of the Royal Australasian College of Physicians
Charles Darwin University alumni